The 1998 NAIA Division II men's basketball tournament  was the tournament held by the NAIA to determine the national champion of men's college basketball among its Division II members in the United States and Canada for the 1997–98 basketball season.

Top-seeded defending champions Bethel (IN) defeated Oregon Tech in the championship game, 89–87, to claim the Pilots' third NAIA national title.

The tournament was played at the Idaho Center at Northwest Nazarene University in Nampa, Idaho.

Qualification

The tournament field remained fixed at thirty-two teams, and the top sixteen teams were seeded.

The tournament continued to utilize a single-elimination format.

Bracket

See also
1998 NAIA Division I men's basketball tournament
1998 NCAA Division I men's basketball tournament
1998 NCAA Division II men's basketball tournament
1998 NCAA Division III men's basketball tournament
1998 NAIA Division II women's basketball tournament

References

NAIA
NAIA Men's Basketball Championship
1998 in sports in Idaho